Irradiant is the third album by the French technical death metal band Scarve. This is the last album to feature Guillaume Bideau's vocals as he joined the Danish industrial metal band Mnemic in October 2006. The digipak version of the album includes two live bonus tracks "Heaven-Sent" and "Luminiferous", two video clips; "Mirthless Perspectives" and "Emulate the Soul" as well as an extended CD-ROM feature.

Fredrik Thordendal of Meshuggah contributed a guitar solo on the song "Asphyxiate", while Gustaf Jorde of Defleshed contributed extra vocals to the song "Molten Scars".

"Mirthless Perspectives" and "Emulate the Soul" were made as music videos.

"Irradiant" was released as a single.

Track listing

 "Mirthless Perspectives" – 3:45 (5:13 in the Digipak Edition, there's an intro for the song of 1:27)
 "An Emptier Void" – 3:39
 "Irradiant" – 4:05
 "Asphyxiate" – 4:52 (featuring Fredrik Thordendal of Meshuggah)
 "Hyperconscience" – 4:16
 "The Perfect Disaster" – 5:13
 "Molten Scars" – 2:46 (featuring Gustaf Jorde of Defleshed)
 "Fire Proven" – 6:29
 "Boiling Calm" – 7:44

Digipak version
 "Heaven-Sent" (live bonus track) - 3:56
 "Luminiferous" (live bonus track) - 4:47

Credits

Band members
 Pierrick Valence − harsh vocals
 Guillaume Bideau − clean/harsh vocals
 Patrick Martin − rhythm guitar
 Sylvain Coudret − rhythm/lead guitar
 Loïc Colin − bass guitar
 Dirk Verbeuren − drums

Guest musicians
 Fredrik Thordendal − guitar solo on "Asphyxiate"
 Gustaf Jorde − vocals on "Molten Scars"

Footnotes

Scarve albums
2004 albums